Wolfram Kuschke (born 9 April 1950 in Menden (Sauerland), North Rhine-Westphalia) is a politician. He is a member of the parliament in North Rhine-Westphalia for SPD.

Political career
He started his career in 1972. From 2002 to 2005 he was nominated as a minister (government). Formerly he was the president of Regierungsbezirk Arnsberg (1998–2002).

References

External links
 Personal Web page 

1950 births
Living people
People from Menden (Sauerland)
Social Democratic Party of Germany politicians
Arnsberg
Members of the Landtag of North Rhine-Westphalia
Officers Crosses of the Order of Merit of the Federal Republic of Germany